Hishamuddin Rais (also known under the pen-name of Isham) is a Malaysian film director, stand-up comedian, political and social activist. He is also notable as a columnist for several newspapers including Berita Minggu, The Sun, Malaysiakini.com and Off The Edge.

Education 
Hishamuddin completed his secondary education at the Malay College Kuala Kangsar. He obtained his degree in South East Asia History in 1971 from University of Malaya. He is also a film and video graduate from University of Westminster, London.

He is fluent in the French language.

Bibliography 
 Pilihanraya atau Pilihan Jalanraya  (2002).
 Keganasan, Penipuan & Internet (2008)
 Tapai: Travel and Guilty Pleasures of a Fermented Malaysian (2010)
 Tertangkapnya Sa-ekor Toyo: Surat dari Teoh Beng Hock (2011)
 Tipu Pilihan Raya, Turun Jalan Raya (2013)

Filmography
Hishamuddin has produced and directed several films, namely:

Short films
 From here to a long yesterday
 Malaysia werewolf in london
 Three second of see

Feature films

Stand-up comedy 
Hishamuddin is also a notable stand-up comedian, having performed several shows in Malaysia and in foreign countries, most recently in the United Kingdom.

Politics 
Hishamuddin was actively involved in campus politics whilst he was still studying at University of Malaya. His subsequent entry into Malaysian politics came after he returned to Malaysia in 1994 after having graduated in film and video from the University of Westminster, London in 1992. He organised several street demonstrations from 1998 to 2000 following the ouster of deputy prime minister of Malaysia, Anwar Ibrahim.

ISA detention
In 2001, Hishamuddin was arrested under the section 71(3) of the Internal Security Act 1984 on the charge of conspiracy to overthrow the government with threat and violence.

Sedition charge
In 2013,together with Tian Chua and Adam Adli Abdul Halim, Hishammuddin was charged with sedition for their speeches at Kuala Lumpur Selangor Chinese Assembly hall on 13 May.

References

External links
 

1951 births
Malaysian film directors
Malay people
Malaysian politicians
Living people
Malaysian stand-up comedians